Tom Uttech (born 1942) is an American landscape painter and photographer who was born in Merrill, Wisconsin.  He received a BA from Layton School of Art (Milwaukee) in 1965 and earned an MFA from the University of Cincinnati in 1976.  He currently resides in Saukville, Wisconsin.

Uttech is known for his moody depictions of North American woodlands, and animals that inhabit them.  Uttech's painting Neiab Nin Nasikodadimin, Bejigwan (Chippewa for "we reunite") in the collection of the Honolulu Museum of Art is typical of the artist's moody, but slightly stylized, landscapes.  The Columbus Museum (Columbus, Georgia), the Crystal Bridges Museum of American Art (Bentonville, Arkansas), the Honolulu Museum of Art, the Leigh Yawkey Woodson Art Museum (Wausau, Wisconsin), the Madison Museum of Contemporary Art (Madison, Wisconsin), the Milwaukee Art Museum, the National Museum of Wildlife Art (Jackson, WY), the New Orleans Museum of Art, the Philbrook Museum of Art (Tulsa, Oklahoma), the Rahr West Art Museum (Manitowoc, Wisconsin), the Southern Alleghenies Museum of Art (Loretto, Pennsylvania), and the Tucson Museum of Art are among the public collections holding works by Tom Uttech.

His highest auction record was sold by Leslie Hindman auction house, for his work, titled "Sabaskong Bay", for over $80,500 on May 15, 2014.

References
 Andrea, Margaret, Magnetic North the Landscapes of Tom Uttech, Milwaukee Art Museum, 2004.
 Milwaukee Art Center, Jerome C. Krause and Tom Uttech: Visions from the North Woods, Milwaukee, Milwaukee Art Center, 1977
 Struve Gallery, Tom Uttech, Chicago, Struve Gallery, 1987.
 Alexandre Gallery, Tom Uttech: New Paintings, New York, Alexandre Gallery, 2004.

External links
 Thomas Martin Uttech in AskArt.com

Footnotes

1942 births
People from Merrill, Wisconsin
20th-century American painters
20th-century American male artists
American male painters
21st-century American painters
21st-century American male artists
Living people
Painters from Wisconsin
People from Saukville, Wisconsin